Mauricio Aspe (born Edgar Mauricio Aspe López on July 25, 1973, in Mexico City, Mexico) is a Mexican actor.

Biography

Career 
He began as a child model before emerging as an actor at age 17, when he joined the school of acting of Televisa to become an actor. His first acting role was in Maria la del Barrio, where he shared credits with Mexican singer/actress, Thalía. Since then he has worked in various telenovelas mainly produced by Televisa. His most recent acting roles include, La Madrastra, Las Dos Caras de Ana and Querida Enemiga, a telenovela produced by Televisa.

Personal life 
He was married to also actress Margarita Magaña with whom he has one child, a daughter called Shakti (b. 2000). In 2012 married again with Jenniffer Queipo and has another daughter called Kala (b.2015)

Filmography

Awards and nominations

References

External links

1973 births
Living people
Mexican male telenovela actors
Mexican male television actors
Mexican male models
Male actors from Mexico City
20th-century Mexican male actors
21st-century Mexican male actors